Townsville Power Station is located in Yabulu, an industrial suburb of Townsville. The station is owned by RATCH-Australia. The station has a 160 MW Siemens turbine and an 82 MW heat recovery steam generator.

The station was built in the late 1990s as an open-cycle plant and was upgraded to combined-cycle operation in 2005.

See also
 List of power stations in Queensland

References

Buildings and structures in Townsville
Natural gas-fired power stations in Queensland
1999 establishments in Australia